María José Martínez Sánchez and Anabel Medina Garrigues were the defending champions, but none competed this year. Martínez Sánchez decided to compete in Scottsdale at the same week.

Virginia Ruano Pascual and Paola Suárez won the title by defeating Tina Križan and Katarina Srebotnik 7–5, 6–1 in the final.

Seeds

Draw

Draw

Qualifying

Seeds

Qualifiers
  Nuria Llagostera Vives /  Mariam Ramón Climent

Qualifying draw

References
 ITF tournament profile

2002 Abierto Mexicano Pegaso
Abierto Mexicano Pegaso